Alo Põldmäe (born 22 May 1945 in Tartu) is an Estonian composer.

In 1970, he graduated from Tallinn State Conservatory.

1972–1980, he was music editor in film studio Tallinnfilm.

In 2009, he founded Estonian National Piano Museum.

Since 1971, he is a member of Estonian Composers' Union.

Awards:
 2005: Annual Prize of the Endowment for Music of the Cultural Endowment of Estonia
 2007: Heino Eller Music Prize

Works

 ballett "Merineitsi" (1974)
 "Concert for Oboe" (1974)
 puppet musical "Verine John" (1980)
 chamber opera "Raeooper" (1986)

References

Living people
1945 births
Estonian composers